Lai Neir may refer to:

Lai Neir (Alp Flix), Sur, a lake in the Grisons, Switzerland ("black lake")

See also
Lai Nair, Tarasp
Lej Nair (Bernina), Pontresina 
Lej Nair (Silvaplana)
Black Lake (disambiguation)